Frecciarossa is a high-speed train of the Italian national train operator, Trenitalia, and a member of the train category Le Frecce. The name, which, if spelled "Freccia rossa" means "Red arrow" in English, was introduced in 2008 after it had previously been known as Eurostar Italia. Frecciarossa is the premier service of Trenitalia and competes with italo, operated by Nuovo Trasporto Viaggiatori.

Routes
Frecciarossa trains operate the following services:
 Turin/Brescia - Milan - Reggio Emilia AV - Bologna - Florence - Rome - Naples - Salerno
 Turin - Milan - Brescia - Verona - Vicenza - Padua - Venice - Monfalcone - Trieste
 Venice - Padua - Bologna - Florence - Rome - Naples - Salerno
 Bergamo - Brescia - Verona - Bologna - Florence - Rome
 Udine - Pordenone - Treviso - Venice - Padua - Vicenza - Verona - Brescia - Milan
 Milan - Reggio Emilia AV - Bologna - Rimini - Ancona - Pescara - Termoli - Foggia - Bari - Brindisi - Lecce
 Milan - Turin - Bardonecchia - Modane (FR) - Chambéry (FR) - Lyon (FR) - Paris (FR)
 Milan - Bologna - Florence - Rome - Naples - Salerno - Potenza - Ferrandina - Metaponto - Taranto
 Venice - Padua - Vicenza - Verona - Brescia - Milan - Pavia - Genoa
 Venice - Padua - Ferrara - Bologna - Florence - Rome - Naples - Salerno
 Perugia - Arezzo - Florence - Bologna - Reggio Emilia AV - Milan - Turin
 Milan - Reggio Emilia AV - Bologna - Florence - Rome - Naples - Salerno - Agropoli - Sapri
 Milan - Reggio Emilia EV - Bologna - Florence - Paola - Lamezia - Rosarno - Villa San Giovanni - Reggio Calabria
 Lyon Perrache (FR) - Lyon Part Dieu (FR) - Paris (FR)

Rolling stock
The following rolling stock types are used for Frecciarossa services:
Frecciarossa trains travel on dedicated high-speed railway lines and, on some routes, also on conventional railway lines with lower speed limits.

Accidents and incidents
On 6 February 2020, a Frecciarossa train derailed at Ospedaletto Lodigiano, killing two people and injuring 27 others.

See also
Frecciargento
Frecciabianca
High-speed rail in Italy
Eurostar Italia
Train categories in Europe

References

External links

High-speed rail in Italy
Ferrovie dello Stato Italiane
High-speed rail in France